= Half-maximal concentration =

Half-maximal concentration can refer to either of the following:

- EC_{50} - half-maximal effective concentration
- IC_{50} - half-maximal inhibitory concentration
